Karl Heinrich Otto Rühle (23 October 1874 – 24 June 1943) was a German Marxist active in opposition to both the First and Second World Wars as well as a council communist theorist.

Early years
Otto was born in Großschirma, Saxony on 23 October 1874. His father was a railway official. In 1889 he started to train as teacher in Oschatz. While there he became involved with the German Freethinkers League. In 1895 he became the private tutor for the Countess von Bühren, while also teaching at Öderan.

Political career
He joined the Social Democratic Party of Germany (SPD) in 1896 and soon established a socialist Sunday school. However he was dismissed as  a primary school teacher in 1902, and soon supported himself as a writer and editor of social democratic newspapers in Hamburg, followed by Breslau, Chemnitz, Pirna and Zwickau. Rühle had already become a vocal critic of existing teaching methods and set up a social democratic educational society for the Hamburg area. In 1907 he became an itinerant teacher for the SPD's educational committee and developed a reputation in the SPD, through his socially critical educational writings: "Work and Education" (1904), "The Enlightenment of Children About Sexual Matters", (1907), and, above all, "The Proletarian Child" (1911).

Rühle joined Karl Liebknecht, Rosa Luxemburg, Franz Mehring and others in founding the group and magazine Internationale, which proposed a revolutionary internationalism against a world of warring states. In 1916, Rühle also took part in the Spartacus League.

Reichstag
In 1912 he was elected as deputy for Pirna-Sebnitz, in Saxon Switzerland. He represented the SPD in the Reichstag. In 1918, Rühle decided not to seek re-election. Following the disorderly period of time in Germany, 1918–19, the dissolution of the Reichstag, which would subsequently be the end of Rühle's term in office, is not exactly known. However, given that the abdication of Wilhelm II was the first event in a series of events that would eventually lead to a new republic, this is the date that shall be put as the end of his term in office.

The German Revolution
Rühle participated in the left opposition of the German labour movement, developing both an early communist critique of Bolshevism and an early opposition to fascism. Rühle saw the Soviet Union as a form of state capitalism that had much in common with the state-centred capitalism of the West as well as fascism, saying: It has served as the model for other capitalistic dictatorships. Ideological divergences do not really differentiate socioeconomic systems.

While Rühle saw the Leninist vanguardist party as an appropriate form for the overthrow of tsarism, it was ultimately an inappropriate form for a proletarian revolution. As such, no matter what the actual intentions of the Bolsheviks, what they actually succeeded in bringing about was much more like the bourgeois revolutions of Europe than a proletarian revolution, arguing: This distinction between head and body, between intellectuals and workers, officers and privates, corresponds to the duality of class society. One class is educated to rule; the other to be ruled. Lenin's organisation is only a replica of bourgeois society. His revolution is objectively determined by the forces that create a social order incorporating these class relations, regardless of the subjective goals accompanying this process.

Rühle was also critical of the party as a revolutionary organisational form, stating that "the revolution is not a party affair". As a result, he supported a more council communist approach which emphasised the importance of workers' councils. In October 1921, he was involved in setting up the Allgemeine Arbeiter-Union – Einheitsorganisation.

In Anti-Bolshevik Communism, Paul Mattick describes Rühle as an exemplary radical figure within a German labour movement that had become ossified into various official structures, a perpetual outsider defined by his antagonistic relationship with the labour movement and to Marxism–Leninism as well as to bourgeois democracy and fascism.

With the signing of the Molotov–Ribbentrop Pact in 1939, Rühle began to see the parallels between the two ideological dictators, writing: Russia was the example for fascism. [...] Whether party 'communists' like it or not, the fact remains that the state order and rule in Russia are indistinguishable from those in Italy and Germany. Essentially, they are alike. One may speak of a red, black, or brown 'soviet state', as well as of red, black or brown fascism.

Because of his connection to Leon Trotsky, Rühle found it difficult to find work in Mexico and was forced to hand-paint notecards for hotels to financially survive.

Rühle was a member of the Dewey Commission which cleared Trotsky of all charges made during the Moscow Trials.

In 1928, Rühle wrote a very detailed biography of Karl Marx, Karl Marx: His Life and Works.

Personal life 
In 1921, Rühle married Alice Gerstel, a German-Jewish writer, feminist and psychologist.

In 1936, Gerstel followed him to Mexico.  She committed suicide on the day of his death on 24 June 1943.

See also 
 Exilliteratur
 List of peace activists

References

Sources 

 Otto Rühle at the Marxists Internet Archive.
 Otto Rühle at Kurasje.org.
 "Non-Leninist Marxism: Writings on the Workers Councils" (2007). St. Petersburg, Florida: Red and Black Publishers.  . It includes Ruhle's "The Revolution is Not a Party Affair" and "Report From Moscow".

1874 births
1943 deaths
Adlerian psychology
Anti–World War II activists
Communist Party of Germany politicians
Communist Workers' Party of Germany politicians
Council communists
Exilliteratur writers
Executed communists
Executed revolutionaries
German anti-fascists
German anti–World War I activists
German male writers
German Marxists
German pacifists
German revolutionaries
Left communists
Libertarian socialists
Members of the 13th Reichstag of the German Empire
Marxist theorists
People from Mittelsachsen
People from the Kingdom of Saxony
People of the German Revolution of 1918–1919
Social Democratic Party of Germany politicians
Weimar Republic politicians